Bernhard (Bernát) Fleissig (born 1853, Hungary – died 7 March 1931, Vienna) was a Hungarian-born Austrian chess master.

Bernhard Fleissig took 18th in the Vienna 1882 chess tournament (Wilhelm Steinitz and Szymon Winawer won), took 2nd, behind Vincenz Hruby, at Vienna 1882, and tied for 2nd-3rd with Johann Hermann Bauer but lost a play-off match to him (0–2) at Vienna 1890 (Max Weiss won).

His name is attached to the Fleissig Variation in the Scotch (1.e4 e5 2.Nf3 Nc6 3.d4 exd4 4.Nxd4 Bc5 5.Be3 Qf6 6.c3 Nge7 7.Nc2).

Bernhard (Bernát) Fleissig was the younger brother of Max Fleissig.

External links 
  Chess games of Bernhard Fleissig

References 

Hungarian chess players
Austrian chess players
Jewish chess players
Chess theoreticians
Hungarian Jews
Austrian Jews
1853 births
1931 deaths
Game players from Vienna